The New Brunswick Teachers' Federation (NBTF;  []) is a Canadian trade union and professional association representing 8,400 schoolteachers in New Brunswick. Teachers join the federation through one of its two constituent professional organizations: the New Brunswick Teachers' Association (NBTA), which represents anglophones, or the Association des enseignantes et des enseignants francophones du Nouveau-Brunswick (AEFNB), which represents francophones. The federation was founded in 1970, prior to which all teachers belonged to the NBTA.

History 
The New Brunswick Teachers' Association (NBTA) was founded on 15 November 1902 as the Albert County Teachers' Association. Its name was changed to the New Brunswick Teachers' Union on 4 June 1903. Several months later, at the organization's first convention, it adopted its current name on 22 December 1903 in an effort to eschew the typical approach of labour unions in favour of "develop[ping] along the lines of a professional association".

See also 
 Education in New Brunswick

References

Footnotes

Bibliography

Further reading

External links 
 

1970 establishments in New Brunswick
Education trade unions
Education-related professional associations
Educational organizations based in Canada
Educational organizations established in 1970
Organizations based in Fredericton
Professional associations based in Canada
Trade unions established in 1970
Trade unions in New Brunswick